Jason Wayne Standridge (born November 9, 1978) is an American former professional baseball pitcher. He played in Major League Baseball (MLB) and in Nippon Professional Baseball (NPB).

Career
He played parts of seven seasons in MLB, appearing in 80 games, while compiling an overall 3–9 record with a 5.80 ERA.

Standridge signed with the Fukuoka SoftBank Hawks on June 3, . After a 7–1 record in 17 games for the Hawks in 2007, he struggled with injuries in 2008, posting an 0–2 record in three games, and was subsequently released.

In January , Standridge inked a minor league contract with the Florida Marlins. He was assigned to the Marlins' AAA affiliate, the New Orleans Zephyrs, but was released by the team in late April after a lackluster showing.

On January 14, Standridge signed a minor league contract with the Philadelphia Phillies, but was released after spring training. He signed a contract on April 5 to return to Nippon Professional Baseball with the Hanshin Tigers. Standridge played four seasons with the Tigers and had an overall record of 35–36.

Standridge returned to Fukuoka as a key starter for SoftBank's 2014 and 2015 Nippon Series championship teams, making a combined 49 regular season starts, with an overall 21–15 record.

Standridge signed with the Chiba Lotte Marines of NPB's Pacific League for the 2016 season. In his first year with the Marines, he made 26 starts and had a 7–8 record with a 4.12 ERA. He was released on January 15, 2018.

Standridge retired after the 2018 season.

Standridge featured a fastball, curveball, slider, and changeup.

Personal life
Standridge graduated from Hewitt-Trussville High School in suburban Birmingham.

References

External links

1978 births
Living people
Águilas Cibaeñas players
American expatriate baseball players in the Dominican Republic
American expatriate baseball players in Japan
Baseball players from Birmingham, Alabama
Charleston RiverDogs players
Chiba Lotte Marines players
Cincinnati Reds players
Durham Bulls players
Fukuoka SoftBank Hawks players
Gulf Coast Devil Rays players
Hanshin Tigers players
Louisville Bats players
Major League Baseball pitchers
Montgomery Biscuits players
New Orleans Zephyrs players
Nippon Professional Baseball pitchers
Oklahoma RedHawks players
Omaha Royals players
Orlando Rays players
Princeton Devil Rays players
Tampa Bay Devil Rays players
Texas Rangers players
Somerset Patriots players
St. Petersburg Devil Rays players